The First Stage of the 2011 Copa Santander Libertadores de América ran from January 25 to February 3, 2011 (first legs: January 25–27; second legs: February 1–3).

Format
The twelve teams were drawn into six ties on November 25, 2010, in Asunción.

Teams played in two-legged ties on a home-away basis. Each team earned 3 points for a win, 1 point for a draw, and 0 points for a loss. The following criteria were used for breaking ties on points:
Goal difference
Away goals
Penalty shootout (no extra time is played)
The six winners advanced to the second stage to join the 26 automatic qualifiers.

Matches
Team 1 played the second leg at home.

Match G1

Deportes Tolima won on points 4–1.

Match G2

Jaguares won on points 6–0.

Match G3

Cerro Porteño won on points 4–1.

Match G4

Unión Española won on points 4–1.

Match G5

Tied on points 3–3, Independiente won on goal difference.

Match G6

Grêmio won on points 4–1.

References

External links
Official webpage  

First Stage